Sodium metaborate is a chemical compound of sodium, boron, and oxygen with formula . The name is also applied to several hydrates whose formulas can be written  for various values of n.

The anhydrous and hydrates are colorless crystalline solids. The anhydrous form is hygroscopic.

Hydrates and solubility
The following hydrates crystallize from solutions of the proper composition in various temperature ranges:
 tetrahydrate  from −6 to 53.6 °C 
 dihydrate  from 53.6 °C to 105 °C
 hemihydrate  from 105 °C to the boiling point.
Early reports of a monohydrate  have not been confirmed.

Structure

Anhydrous
Solid anhydrous sodium metaborate has the hexagonal crystal system with space group . It actually contains a six-membered rings with the formula , consisting of alternating boron and oxygen atoms with one negatively charged extra oxygen atom attached to each boron atom. All nine atoms lie on a plane. The six oxygen atoms are evenly divided into two distinct structural sites, with different B–O bond lengths: B–O(external) 128.0 pm and B–O(bridge) 143.3 pm. The density is 2.348 ± 0.005 g/cm3. The approximate dimensions of the hexagonal cell are a = 1275 pm, c = 733 pm. However, the true unit cell is rhomboedral and has dimensions: ar= 776 pm, α = 110.6°, Z = 6 (5.98) molecules KB0

Dihydrate
The dihydrate  crystallizes in the triclinic crystal system, but is nearly monoclinic, with both α and γ very close to 90°. The cell parameters are a = 678 pm , b = 1058A pm, c = 588 pm, α = 91.5°, β = 22.5°, γ = 89°, Z = 4, density 1.905 g/cm3. The refractive indices at 25°C and wavelength 589.3 nm are α = 1.439, β = 1.473, γ = 1.484. The dispersion is strong, greater at red than at violet.

The transition temperature between the dihydrate and the hemihydrate is 54 °C. However, the crystalline dihydrate will remain metastable until 106 °C to 110 °C, and change slowly above that temperature.

Vapor
Infrared spectroscopy of the vapor from anhydrous sodium metaborate, heated to between 900 °C and 1400 °C, shows mostly isolated clusters with formula , and some dimers thereof. Electron diffraction studies by Akishin and Spiridonov showed a structure  with linear anion  and angle  of 90-110°. The atomic distances are : 120 pm, : 136 pm,: 214 pm

Preparation
Sodium metaborate is prepared by the fusion of sodium carbonate and boron oxide  or borax . Another way to create the compound is by the fusion of borax with sodium hydroxide at 700 °C:

The boiling point of sodium metaborate (1434 °C) is lower than that of boron oxide (1860 °C) and borax (1575 °C) In fact, while the metaborate boils without change of composition, borax gives off a vapor of sodium metaborate with a small excess of sodium oxide .

The anhydrous salt can also be prepared from the tetraborate by heating to 270 °C in vacuum.

Reactions

With water
When sodium metaborate is dissolved in water, the anion combines with two water molecules to form the tetrahydroxyborate anion .

Electrochemical conversion to borax
Electrolysis of a concentrated aqueous solution of 20%  with an anion exchange membrane and inert anode (such as gold, palladium, or boron-doped diamond) converts the metaborate anion to tetraborate , and the sodium salt of the later (borax) precipitates as a white powder.

Hydrolysis of sodium borohydride
Hydrolysis of sodium borohydride  with a suitable catalyst gives sodium metaborate:
 (ΔH = −217 kJ/mol)

Reduction to sodium borohydride

Another method is the electrolytic reduction of a concentrated sodium metaborate solution, namely

However, this method is not efficient since it competes with the reduction of hydroxide:

Nanofiltration membranes can effectively separate the borohydride from the metaborate.

Reaction with alcohols
Anhydrous sodium metaborate refluxed with methanol yields the corresponding sodium tetramethoxyborate (melting point: 253-258 °C, CAS number: 18024-69-6):

The analogous reaction with ethanol yields the sodium tetraethoxyborate.

Uses
Current and proposed applications of sodium metaborate include:
Manufacture of borosilicate glasses, which are resistant to uneven or fast heating because of their small coefficient of thermal expansion.
Composition of herbicides.
Raising the pH of injected fluids for oil extraction.

See also
 Borate

References

Borates
Sodium compounds